Chalinargues (Auvergnat: Chinargues) is a former commune in the Cantal department in south-central France. On 1 December 2016, it was merged into the new commune Neussargues en Pinatelle.

Population

See also
Communes of the Cantal department

References

Former communes of Cantal
Populated places disestablished in 2016